Joe Bennett (1889 - August 31, 1967) was an American vaudeville eccentric dancer. Harland Dixon described him as "[having] legs of iron ... He only had a few routines but they were gifts from heaven - the greatest comedy dancer I ever saw."

Biography
He was born in 1889. He died on August 31, 1967 at Our Lady of Consolation in Amityville, New York, at age 78.

References

1889 births
1967 deaths
Eccentric dancers
Place of birth missing